Eric Patterson may refer to:
 Eric Patterson (baseball), American baseball player
 Eric Patterson (American football), American football cornerback
 Eric D. Patterson, American political scientist
 L. Eric Patterson, United States Air Force general

See also
 Erik Patterson, American screenwriter, television writer, and playwright
 Eric Paterson, Canadian ice hockey player